Battle of Samugarh, Jang-e-Samugarh, (May 29, 1658), was a deciding battle in the struggle for the throne during the Mughal war of succession (1658–1659) between the sons of the Mughal Emperor Shah Jahan after the emperor's serious illness in September 1657. The battle of Samugarh was fought between his sons Dara Shikoh (the eldest son and heir apparent) and his three younger brothers Aurangzeb,Shah ShujaandMurad Baksh (third and fourth sons of Shah Jahan) to decide who will be the heir of the throne after their father.

Dara Shikoh began to retreat towards Samugarh, about 10 miles (16 km) east of Agra, India, south of the Yamuna River, after Aurangzeb had defeated Dara Shikoh's forces during the Battle of Dharmat. Aurangzeb and his smaller but formidable army then flanked Dara’s fortified line along the Chambal River by finding a little-known and unguarded ford. The battle was fought during northern India's warmest season and Aurangzeb's men were on the march for a very long while. The army of Aurangzeb arrived with yellow banners and flags and fortified their position in front of the heir apparent. Dara Shikoh then tried to protect his rear flank by erecting massive red tents and banners.

Preparations

Dara Shikoh ordered his large cannons from Jaigarh Fort to be chained together (limiting their mobility), Zamburak's armed with swivel guns were positioned behind the cannons and infantry Sepoys armed with muskets defended both the cannons and the Zamburak (Aurangzeb also adopted this maneuver). However, the experienced and accomplished Mughal general Mir Jumla II, positioned hidden cannons in strategic locations across the battlefield assuring Aurangzeb of successful grapeshot's and sudden assaults.

Both Aurangzeb and Dara Shikoh were seated on massive Elephant Howdahs and armed with Matchlocks. Aurangzeb's far left flank was commanded by Murad Baksh and his elite Mughal Sowars, the rest of the army was effectively under the command of Aurangzeb and his assisting imperial general Mir Jumla II, Murshid Quli Khan was assigned as the Mir Atish (artillery chief). Dara Shikoh on the other hand, divided his massive army, his far right was commanded by the Rao Raja Chattar Sal of Bundi, his main right was commanded by Rustam Khan Deccani who was well appointed by Shah Jahan, his elite Mughal Sowars were commanded by Khalilullah Khan an Uzbek commander, furthermore Dara Shikoh awaited the arrival of his son Sulaiman Shikoh commanding 40,000.

Battle

The battle began when Dara Shikoh ordered his cannons to start firing towards the army of Aurangzeb. Eventually both sides began to launch volley's against each other. Their artillery shelling had to be postponed due to brief raining. When the rains subsided both sides resumed firing. Angered by the cannon fire, Murad Baksh and his Sowars began a swift charge into the far right flank of Dara Shikoh, commanded by Chattar Sal, without the orders of Aurangzeb. It is believed that Murad Baksh was a sworn enemy of Chattar Sal. They both fought ferociously on the battlefield as the Sowars of Murad Baksh and the Rajput warriors of Chattar Sal decimated each other. Khalilullah Khan refused to aid the Rajputs and instead guided his forces to protect Dara Shikoh. Fearing the impending collapse of the Chattar Sal and the Rajput far right, Rustam Khan Deccani led a massive Sowar charge towards the cannon in front of Aurangzeb, in his attempt to flank and attack Murad Baksh from behind. But his efforts were met by ferocious cannon fire by Aurangzeb that eventually caused the death of Rustam Khan Deccani and many of Dara Shikoh's most important Sowars. Meanwhile, it is believed that Murad Baksh killed the Rajput second in command Ram Singh Rautela (Raja Rautela) by shooting an arrow from his composite bow. The arrow is known to have pierced the turban of Ram Singh Rautela and eventually rendered the Rajputs leaderless on the battlefield.

When Dara Shikoh was informed about the death of Chattar Sal, Murad Baksh, the collapse of the Rajput infantry and the Deccan Sowars, he immediately pushed towards their aid alongside Khalilullah Khan in an attempt to rout the wounded but very formidable Murad Baksh. But Dara Shikoh faced heavy bombardment by the cannon front of Aurangzeb, the bombardment even made its way into the cannon front of Dara Shikoh causing massive disarray among his ranks. Due to Aurangzeb's heavy bombardment Dara Shikoh decided to join Khalilullah Khan in the Cavalry. The outcome of the battle was decided when Dara Shikoh descended from his Elephant Howdah at the most critical moment of the battle, his elephant then quickly fled from the battlefield. Fleeing elephant was evidence enough for Dara Shikoh's troops who mistook this event to indicate his death. Thousands of Dara Shikoh's forces surrendered to Aurangzeb when the Mughal military band of Aurangzeb played the ode of victory. Many more Sepoys and Sowars fled only to take the oath of allegiance to Aurangzeb later on.

Conclusion

Dara Shikoh’s army fled to Gobindwal where Guru Har Rai had deployed his army, the Akal Sena, to prevent and delay Aurangzeb’s army from pursuing Dara Shikoh.

Although Dara Shikoh was the most powerful man in the Mughal Empire after his father Shah Jahan, he knew little about the art of war and military command. His loosely knit army eventually crumbled and even refused to aid each other. The ferocious assault by Murad Baksh was very successful, although he was eventually wounded and his horse was killed. Despite being surrounded by the Rajputs and the Deccan Sowars, Murad Baksh managed to protect himself and his Sowars until the end of the battle. He is also known to have killed Raja Rautela through his archery skills. When the battle ended Dara Shikoh and Khalilullah Khan fled towards Sulaiman Shikoh and Aurangzeb was declared the new Mughal Emperor.

Aurangzeb then marched onwards to Agra which he besieged, however not until he closed down the city's water supply did his father Shah Jahan finally surrender. Shah Jahan was soon imprisoned in the Agra Fort. Later Khalilullah Khan swore an oath of allegiance to Aurangzeb as a Mansabdar. Eventually both Dara Shikoh and Sulaiman Shikoh were captured by the Afghan Malik Jiwan Khan, and handed over to Aurangzeb. Dara Shikioh was paraded through the streets of Agra and later declared a "Non-Muslim" during a smear campaign by Aurangzeb. He was later executed along with his son Sulaiman Shikoh. However Aurangzeb's woes had not ended until the year 1659, when another ferocious battle was fought between Aurangzeb and his elder brother Shuja during the Battle of Khajwa.

See also
Shah Jahan
Mughal Empire
Battle of Machhiwara

References

Samugarh
Samugarh
1658 in India